Too Legit for the Pit: Hardcore Takes the Rap is an album of cover versions of rap songs by hardcore punk artists.

Track listing
Express Yourself (N.W.A.) Stretch Arm Strong  4:07
Deep Cover (Dr. Dre and Snoop Dogg) Candiria  4:25
Baby Got Back  (Sir Mix-A-Lot) Throwdown  4:32
Mama Said Knock You Out (LL Cool J) Hoods  1:30
I Can't Do Nuttin' for Ya Man (Public Enemy) The Movielife  2:59
The World Is Yours (Nas) E-Town Concrete  4:59
New Jack Hustler (Ice-T) Clocked In  3:34
The Humpty Dance (Digital Underground) F.O. The Smack Magnet  3:16
P.S.K.! What Does It Mean? (Schoolly D) Skarhead, Lordz of Brooklyn  2:59
White Lines (Don't Do It) (Melle Mel and Grandmaster Flash) Bad Luck 13  3:52
Bust a Move (Young M.C.) Diehard Youth  4:12
Fresh (Fresh 3 MC's) No Redeeming Social Value  15:27
Secret Track: Excerpt: Automobile (N.W.A.) Our Time Down Here (Portland, OR)

See also
Take a Bite Outta Rhyme: A Rock Tribute to Rap: Another compilation that includes rock covers of hip hop songs.

References 

2001 compilation albums
Covers albums
Rapcore compilation albums